The 2015 season is Hougang United's 18th consecutive season in the top flight of Singapore football and in the S.League. Along with the S.League, the club will also compete in the Prime League, the Singapore Cup and the Singapore League Cup.

Squad

Sleague

Transfers

Pre-season transfers

In

Out

Trial

Mid-season transfers

In

Out

Friendlies

Coaching staff

Team statistics

Appearances and goals

Competitions

S.League

Round 1

 

 

Round 2

Round 3

Singapore Cup

Singapore TNP League Cup

Group matches

References

Hougang United FC seasons
Singaporean football clubs 2015 season